Charlotte Aiken (born 23 January 1992 in Plymouth, Devon) is an English ice dancer who represents Great Britain. With her partner Josh Whidborne, she is the 2012 Ondrej Nepela Memorial bronze medalist and 2012 British national silver medalist.

Career 
Aiken teamed up with Whidborne in 2008. They are coached by John Dunn at Lee Valley in London. In 2009, they made the decision to relocate to Deeside in North Wales to train with coach Joan Slater and with the 2002 Olympian Marika Humphreys-Baranova as their choreographer. In January 2011, they relocated to Madrid, Spain, to train with John Dunn. In 2012, Dunn relocated with his students back to the UK.

In the 2012–2013 season, Aiken and Whidborne won their first senior international medal, bronze at the 2012 Ondrej Nepela Memorial. They then won the silver medal at the 2012 British Championships.

Personal life 
Aiken has a younger brother, Henry, who also competes in ice dancing.

Programs 
(with Whidborne)

Results 
(with Whidborne)

References

External links 

 

English female ice dancers
1992 births
Living people
Sportspeople from Plymouth, Devon